Red is a 2010 American action comedy film loosely inspired by the Homage Comics limited series of the same name. Produced by Di Bonaventura Pictures and distributed by Summit Entertainment, it is the first film in the Red series. Directed by Robert Schwentke and written by Jon Hoeber and Erich Hoeber, it stars Bruce Willis, Morgan Freeman, John Malkovich, Helen Mirren, Karl Urban and Mary-Louise Parker, alongside Rebecca Pidgeon, Brian Cox, Richard Dreyfuss, Julian McMahon, Ernest Borgnine, and James Remar. Red follows Frank Moses (Willis), a former black-ops agent who reunites with his old team to capture an assassin who has vowed to kill him.

The film was released on October 15, 2010. It received generally positive reviews from critics and grossed $199 million worldwide, and also received a Golden Globe nomination for Best Motion Picture – Musical or Comedy. A sequel, Red 2, was released on July 19, 2013. A third film was announced as in-development in 2013 but did not come to fruition.

Plot
Former CIA black ops agent Frank Moses (Bruce Willis) lives a quiet life in the suburbs and creates opportunities to talk to pension call center employee Sarah Ross (Mary-Louise Parker). An assassination squad attempts to kill Frank, but he single-handedly kills the entire squad and drives to Sarah's house to protect her. Sarah refuses to leave with Frank so he kidnaps her. CIA agent William Cooper (Karl Urban) is tasked by his corrupt boss Cynthia (Rebecca Pidgeon) to kill Frank.

Frank ties up Sarah in a Louisiana motel room while he visits his former mentor Joe (Morgan Freeman) at a retirement home for help identifying the squad. He learns the same squad murdered a newspaper reporter in New York. Sarah gets loose and calls 9-1-1, accidentally alerting Cooper to her location. Frank saves her. Cooper chases them in a car but they escape to New York City to investigate the reporter who was killed. They find a list of names the reporter was investigating, almost all of whom have recently died. Frank calls Joe but is told Joe has been killed.

Frank and Sarah find retired agent Marvin Boggs (John Malkovich) in Florida, whose name is on the list. Marvin finds all the names on the list are connected to a secret 1981 mission in Guatemala. The three track down pilot Gabriel Singer (James Remar) who flew the mission. He helps Frank and Marvin remember the mission but is killed by a sniper in a helicopter. Frank, Marvin, and Sarah escape. Frank secures the help of retired FSB agent Ivan Simanov (Brian Cox) in exchange for a favor, and with Sarah infiltrates the Secure Records Vault at the CIA to obtain the Guatemala file. The records keeper (Ernest Borgnine) tells Frank that Cooper pulled his file, so Frank pays Cooper a surprise visit in his office. Frank dislocates Cooper's shoulder and Cooper shoots and wounds Frank. Frank and Sarah find Marvin being held at gunpoint by Joe, who survived the attack at the retirement home. The group seeks help from retired British assassin Victoria Winslow (Helen Mirren), who stitches Frank's wound and joins the group as they decide to meet with Alexander Dunning (Richard Dreyfuss), an arms dealer who is the only name left on the list still alive besides Frank and Marvin.

Joe meets with Dunning posing as an African warlord wanting to purchase weapons. Dunning reveals the killings were ordered by the Vice President of the US, Robert Stanton, to cover up Stanton's mass killing of innocent villagers in Guatemala. Meanwhile, Cooper receives a tip leading him to Dunning's mansion where he confronts Frank. Joe sacrifices his life to help Frank and Marvin escape but Sarah is captured by Cooper. Frank breaks into Cooper's house while his family is there and calls Cooper, saying he intends to kill Stanton and if Sarah is harmed he will kill Cooper's family.

Finding the Guatemala file Frank left for him, Cooper realizes that he's being used in the coverup and has himself assigned to Stanton's security detail. The group kidnap Stanton from a fundraising dinner but Victoria is shot and is rescued by Ivan. Frank calls Cooper and arranges to trade Stanton for Sarah. Cooper, Cynthia, and Dunning bring Sarah and meet with Frank. Dunning wounds Stanton and offers to make Cooper CIA Director if Cooper kills Frank and Sarah. Cooper instead kills Cynthia while Frank and an arriving Marvin kill Dunning. Frank and Sarah reunite and Cooper tells them all to leave and that he will clean up the situation.

The group leaves in Ivan's car and Ivan cashes in his favor from Frank. Sarah insists she go along with Frank and Marvin to deal with an issue in Moldova. Frank and Marvin are then shown fleeing Moldovan troops with a stolen nuclear device.

Cast

 Bruce Willis as Frank Moses, a former CIA black ops agent.  Moses is forced into retirement and tagged R.E.D. (Retired, Extremely Dangerous).  He has trouble adjusting to civilian life and still longs for action.  
 Morgan Freeman as Joe Matheson, Frank's mentor at the CIA.  Joe has terminal cancer and lives in a retirement community in Louisiana.
 John Malkovich as Marvin Boggs, a retired CIA agent who was given LSD daily for years as part of illegal agency experiments.  Marvin is extremely paranoid and convinced that the government is constantly trying to kill him.
 Helen Mirren as Victoria Winslow, a retired MI6 assassin who now operates a B&B while still taking contracts on the side.
 Karl Urban as William Cooper, a CIA black ops agent who is tasked with killing Frank.  
 Mary-Louise Parker as Sarah Ross, a call center employee and Frank's love interest.  She is stuck in a boring job and yearns to travel and have adventures.  
 Rebecca Pidgeon as Cynthia Wilkes, Cooper's supervisor at the CIA.  Wilkes is secretly in league with Alexander Dunning and uses Cooper to help Dunning cover up the VP's war crimes.             
 Brian Cox as Ivan Simanov, a retired FSB agent who works for the Russian embassy.  He is still in love with Victoria even after she shot him in the chest.
 Richard Dreyfuss as Alexander Dunning, an arms trafficker who uses his CIA connections to help the Vice President cover up his crimes.
 Julian McMahon as Vice President Robert Stanton.  Stanton intends to run for president and uses Alexander Dunning to cover up his war crimes.
 Ernest Borgnine as Henry, the CIA records keeper.  
 James Remar as Gabriel Singer, a retired Marine helicopter pilot who participated in the Guatemala coverup.

Production

Gregory Noveck, a representative of DC Comics working in Hollywood to get their titles made into films, wanted the comic developed, but Warner Bros. was not interested. The creators of the comic exercised their right to go elsewhere, but this required approval from all divisions of Warner Bros., including television, before it could be approved. After several years, in 2008, Noveck was allowed to take the project to Mark Vahradian at Di Bonaventura Productions. Unusually, this made it the first film from DC not produced by Warner Bros., after the purchase.

In June 2008, Summit Entertainment announced plans to adapt Warren Ellis and Cully Hamner's Red. Red was adapted for the big screen by brothers Erich and Jon Hoeber, who also wrote the adaptations of Whiteout and Alice. The project was produced by Lorenzo di Bonaventura (GI Joe, Transformers).

By April 2009, Bruce Willis was reportedly in discussions with Summit to take the starring role of Frank Moses. It was reported in July 2009 that Morgan Freeman was in talks to co-star alongside Willis in the film. Also in July 2009, Robert Schwentke, the director of The Time Traveler's Wife and Flightplan, was in negotiations to direct Red. In August 2009, Schwentke confirmed to MTV News that he was on board. He stated that he loved the script, but differences existed between the comic and the movie, stating; "It's very funny, which the comic book isn't ... It's not as violent as the comic book," and  "The script that I've read is obviously different from the comic, because I don't think the comic gives you enough for a two-hour movie."

In November 2009, Helen Mirren was reported to be engaged to work alongside Freeman and Willis in the film. Also in November 2009, John C. Reilly and Mary-Louise Parker were in negotiations to join the cast. Reilly would play a retired CIA agent who is paranoid that everyone is out to kill him. Parker would play the romantic interest, a federal pension worker who becomes embroiled in the Willis character's struggle to stay alive. In the same month, Julian McMahon, Ernest Borgnine, Richard Dreyfuss, and Brian Cox entered negotiations to join the cast.

In December 2009, creator Warren Ellis stated on his mailing list: "Read the RED script. Not bad. Not the book, but not bad. Funny. Especially when you know the casting. Very tight piece of work. Talked to the producers last week. They're all kind of giddy over the casting coups. Who wouldn't want to see Helen Mirren with a sniper rifle?" Also in December 2009 Summit Entertainment announced a release date of October 22, 2010. The same month, James Remar was cast in an unspecified role, in addition to Karl Urban as "Cooper". In January 2010, reportedly John Malkovich had signed to star opposite Bruce Willis, replacing John C. Reilly, who exited the role in late December.

Principal photography began on January 18, 2010, in Toronto, Canada. Red was shot in and around the Toronto metropolitan area for nine weeks before moving on to the road and ending in New Orleans in late March for the final two weeks of principal photography. Filming in the French Quarter of New Orleans commenced in March 2010. Additional photography was shot for a post-credits scene in Louisiana in August 2010.

Release

The film premiered at Grauman's Chinese Theatre in Hollywood on October 11, 2010. Red was released on Blu-ray and DVD on January 25, 2011. The film was released by Summit Entertainment in the US and Entertainment One in the UK. Lionsgate Home Entertainment later released it on Ultra HD Blu-ray on September 5, 2017.

Reception

Box office
On its opening weekend, Red earned an estimated $22.5 million on around 4,100 screens at 3,255 locations, coming in second behind Jackass 3-D. The film closed in theaters on February 3, 2011, grossing $90 million in the United States, and $108.6 million in foreign markets, for a worldwide gross of $199 million.

Critical response

On Rotten Tomatoes the film holds an approval rating of 72% based on 213 reviews, with an average rating of 6.40/10. The site's critics consensus reads: "It may not be the killer thrill ride you'd expect from an action movie with a cast of this caliber, but Red still thoroughly outshines most of its big-budget counterparts with its wit and style." Metacritic gave the film a weighted average score of 60 out of 100 based 38 critics, indicating "mixed or average reviews". Audiences polled by CinemaScore gave the film an average grade of "A−" on an A+ to F scale.

Justin Chang of Variety stated Red is "An amusing, light-footed caper about a team of aging CIA veterans rudely forced out of retirement". John DeFore of The Hollywood Reporter stated "Although tailor-made for genre fans, it benefits from flavors of humor and romance that keep its appeal from being fanboy-only".

Roger Ebert gave the film two stars out of four, stating that it is "neither a good movie nor a bad one. It features actors that we like doing things we wish were more interesting." A. O. Scott of The New York Times said, "It is possible to have a good time at Red, but it is not a very good movie. It doesn't really try to be, and given the present state of the Hollywood economy, this may be a wise choice". Kenneth Turan of the Los Angeles Times said, "It's not that it doesn't have effective moments, it's that it doesn't have as many as it thinks it does. The film's inescapable air of glib self-satisfaction is not only largely unearned, it's downright irritating".

Accolades

Sequel

The film's financial success surpassed producer Lorenzo di Bonaventura's expectations. In October 2011, Summit Entertainment officially announced that Red 2 would be released on August 2, 2013, with Jon and Erich Hoeber rehired to write the screenplay. In March 2013, the film's release date was moved from August 2, 2013 to July 19, 2013. The sequel fared worse than its predecessor both critically and financially. The film received mixed reviews from critics and grossed $148.1 million worldwide.

References

External links
 

 
 
 
 
 
 
 

Red (franchise)
2010 films
2010s spy films
American spy films
American action comedy films
2010s spy comedy films
Films about the Central Intelligence Agency
Films set in Cleveland
Films set in Kansas City, Missouri
Films set in New Orleans
Films set in New York City
Films set in Virginia
Films set in Florida
Films set in Alabama
Films set in Montgomery County, Maryland
Films set in Chicago
Films set in Moldova
Films shot in New Orleans
Films shot in Toronto
Live-action films based on comics
Di Bonaventura Pictures films
Summit Entertainment films
Films based on works by Warren Ellis
Films based on WildStorm titles
Films directed by Robert Schwentke
Films scored by Christophe Beck
Films produced by Lorenzo di Bonaventura
2010 action comedy films
2010s English-language films
2010s American films